Olivia "Liv" Hamilton (born 28 February 2001) is an English field hockey player who plays as a defender for Loughborough Students and the England and Great Britain national teams.

Club career

Hamilton plays club hockey in the Women's England Hockey League Premier Division for Loughborough Students. She previously played for Team Bath Buccaneers.

Personal life
She has a twin sister, Sophie, who plays with her on the national team.

References

External links

2001 births
Living people
English female field hockey players
Women's England Hockey League players
Twin sportspeople
English twins